Gauri Shankar Shejwar is a senior political leader of Bharatiya Janata Party in Madhya Pradesh and was a senior Cabinet Minister in the state government from 2013-18. He was a Cabinet Minister in-charge of multiple portfolios such as Forests, Planning, Economics & Statistics in the Madhya Pradesh State Government headed by Chief Minister Shivraj Singh Chouhan from 2013-2018. He was also the Minister in-charge of the Narmada Seva Yatra - a unique river conservation and development programme led by Shivraj Singh Chouhan. In the past, he has been cabinet minister in different BJP governments that have governed Madhya Pradesh. He has held important portfolios such as Forests, Home Affairs, Power & Energy, Health, and Education during his different tenures as Cabinet Minister.

Political career
Shejwar has played a very active and important role at the grass-root level to strengthen the BJP in Madhya Pradesh during the 1980s and 1990s. He was elected to the State Assembly (Vidhan Sabha) as MLA for the first time at the age of 27 years in 1977 on a ticket from [Bharatiya Jana Sangh], the erstwhile name of BJP. He was also State Vice-President of Janata Yuva Morcha during his initial political career. He has been the lead campaign manager for former Prime Minister Atal Bihari Vajpayee when the latter won from Vidisha Lok Sabha constituency in MP during the 1991 general elections. He was elected Bharatiya Janata Party (BJP) MLA 7 times from Raisen district in Madhya Pradesh (MP) out of 9 times that he contested assembly elections. 

He also led the BJP Legislative Party as the Leader of Opposition (1999–2002) in the MP Legislative Assembly during Digvijaya Singh's second term in power and played an important role in laying the foundation for BJP's return to power in the subsequent state elections in 2003. He has been a senior Cabinet Minister in every BJP government that governed Madhya Pradesh since the 1990s and is well regarded in political circles for his wide experience in administrative and legislative matters. He is a trained medical doctor from Gandhi Medical College - Bhopal.

He did not contest the state elections of Madhya Pradesh in 2018 to focus on his son's electoral debut instead.

Born in 1950 in Udaipura in Raisen district, Shejwar is personally involved in agricultural and charitable healthcare activities. He is married to Kiran Shejwar and has a son and two daughters.

See also 

 Third Chouhan ministry

References

 Dept. of Public Relations - Life Sketch 
 Cabinet Ministers of Madhya Pradesh 
 दुनिया का सबसे बड़ा नदी संरक्षण अभियान
 Narmada revival is model for country, says PM Narendra Modi

Living people
State cabinet ministers of Madhya Pradesh
1950 births
People from Raisen district
Politicians from Bhopal
Bharatiya Janata Party politicians from Madhya Pradesh
Madhya Pradesh MLAs 1998–2003
Madhya Pradesh MLAs 1993–1998
Madhya Pradesh MLAs 2013–2018
Leaders of the Opposition in Madhya Pradesh